Dinocrates of Rhodes (also Deinocrates, Dimocrates, Cheirocrates and Stasicrates; , fl. last quarter of the 4th century BC) was a Greek architect and technical adviser for Alexander the Great. He is known for his plan for the city of Alexandria, the monumental funeral pyre for Hephaestion and the reconstruction of the Temple of Artemis at Ephesus, as well as other works.

City proposal of Mount Athos

Dinocrates is noted by Vitruvius, in the only surviving architectural treatise from Antiquity, for his plan to sculpt in the flank of Mount Athos a colossal image of Alexander, holding a small city in one hand and with the other, pouring from a gigantic pitcher a river into the sea. Alexander dropped the proposal as Dinocrates reportedly did not consider the living conditions of the residents when he admitted to not planning for grain to be grown near the city; instead, it was to be transported by sea. The site of the current Alexandria was much more fertile and open than the harsh terrain of Mount Athos.

Plan of Alexandria

In 332 BC, Alexander appointed Dinocrates as director of the surveying and urban-planning work for the city of Alexandria (on the Mediterranean coast of Egypt), which was laid out on a Hippodamian grid plan that was influential in Hellenistic city planning. He was aided by Cleomenes of Naucratis and by Crates of Olynthus, an esteemed hydraulic engineer who built the waterworks for the city and the sewer system demanded by the low-lying site.

Pyre of Hephaestion

In Babylon, he designed the funerary monument to Alexander's general Hephaestion (died in 324 BC), which was described by Diodorus Siculus, Arrian, Strabo, Plutarch and others. It was built of stone (unavailable locally) in imitation of a Babylonian temple, six stories tall, and entirely gilded.

Second Temple of Artemis

Dinocrates was involved in reconstructing the Temple of Artemis—one of the seven wonders of the world—which had been destroyed by Herostratus in an act of arson on July 21, 356 BC, the same night, it was said, that Alexander was being born.

Other works

Dinocrates also worked on an incomplete funerary monument for Alexander's father, Philip II. Other works include several city plans and temples in Delphi, Delos and other Greek cities.
According to preliminary findings by archaeologists he may have been the architect of a vast Hellenistic tomb found at Amphipolis in 2012.

Notes

References
Archived copy of "Deinocrates of Rhodes". Technology Museum of Thessaloniki. archived 24 February 2007.

External links

Architects of Alexander the Great
Ancient Greek architects
Ancient Greek urban planners
Ancient Rhodian scientists
4th-century BC Rhodians
Year of birth unknown
Year of death unknown
4th-century BC architects